Satin Sheets is the second studio album released by American country artist Jeanne Pruett. The album was released in June 1973 on MCA Records and was produced by Walter Haynes. The album contained Pruett's first major hit and signature song of the same name as the album. The single reached number one on the Billboard Country Chart. The album was released in late spring 1973.

Background and content 
Satin Sheets contained ten tracks of newly recorded material. The album was recorded in three separate sessions at Bradley's Barn Studio in Mount Juliet, Tennessee. The first session took place in December 1972, which recorded the title track and "Sweet Sweetheart". In January 1973, "Ive Been Wrong for So Long" and "Lonely Women Cryin" were recorded. The final songs were recorded in a session that took place in April 1973. Most of the songs on the album were aimed more towards a Traditional country style, unlike the conventional Nashville Sound musical style used at the time on most country music sessions. This was seen particularly on songs such as the title track and "Walking Piece of Heaven". Many of the songs consisted of themes about passion and romance, including the title track, "Is Her Love Any Better Than Mine" and "Your Memory's Comin' On" in a Country Pop and Traditional Country style. The album was later reviewed by Allmusic which gave it three out of five stars.

Satin Sheets was originally released as the lead and title track of an LP record which comprised 11 songs. The album has never been issued on conventional compact disc but has been available on CreateSpace recordable audio CD since April 16, 2012.

Release 
Satin Sheets''' name derived from the album's title track, which was the lead single and only single released from the album. The single released in February 1973, becoming Pruett's first major hit, peaking at number one on the Billboard Magazine Hot Country Singles chart the week of May 23 and number 28 on the Billboard Hot 100 shortly afterward. The single later returned to number one on the country chart the week of June 23. In addition, it also peaked at number three on the Canadian RPM Country Tracks chart and number seventy six on the RPM Top Singles Chart. Satin Sheets was released around the same time its single became a major hit. The album peaked at number 1 on the Billboard Magazine Top Country Albums chart and number 122 on the Billboard 200 albums chart. Satin Sheets'' spent eight weeks at number one on the Top Country Albums, becoming the second-longest running album on the chart by a female artist.

Track listing 
Side one
"Satin Sheets" (John E. Volenkaty) – 3:27
"Walking Piece of Heaven" (Marty Robbins) – 3:01
"Hold on Woman" (Sharon Higgins) – 2:26
"Baby's Gone" (Conway Twitty, Billy Parks) – 2:41
"Sweet Sweetheart" (Carole King, Gerry Goffin) – 2:31
"Lonely Women Cryin'" (Faye Bradshaw) – 2:52

Side two
"What My Thoughts Do All the Time" (Jeanne Pruett) – 3:03
"The Only Way to Hold Your Man" (Sharon Higgins) – 2:45
"Is Her Love Any Better Than Mine" (Ray Griff) – 2:38
"I've Been So Wrong, for So Long" (Bud Reneau, Hal Bynum) – 2:45
"Your Memory's Comin' On" (Jeanne Pruett) – 2:49

Personnel 
Jeanne Pruett – Vocals
Grady Martin – Guitar
Harold Bradley – Guitar
Jerry Shook – Guitar, harmonica
Pete Wade – Guitar
Bob Moore – Bass
Jerry Smith – Piano
Buddy Harman – Drums
The Jordanaires – Background Vocals 
Duane West, Winnifred Breast, Millie Kirkham, Laverna Moore — Background Vocals

Sales chart positions

Weekly charts

Year-end charts

Singles

References 

1973 albums
Jeanne Pruett albums
MCA Records albums